Hoh or HOH most commonly refers to:

 HOH, a variation of the chemical formula for water
 Hoh, a Native American tribe in the United States

Hoh or HOH may also refer to:

Places
 Hoh River, in the U.S. state of Washington
 Hoh Rainforest, on the Olympic Peninsula in the U.S. state of Washington
 Harrow-on-the-Hill station, England, by National Rail station code

People
 Hilmar Örn Hilmarsson (born 1958), Icelandic musician and religious organisation leader
 Herman Otto Hartley (1912–1980), American statistician

Other
 Head Over Heels (video game), a 1987 isometric video game by Ocean Software Ltd
 The House of Hair, a Glam metal radio show hosted by Dee Snider of Twisted Sister
 Hard of hearing, hearing loss
 Head of Household, a filing status for individual U.S. taxpayers
 House of Hardcore, a U.S. wrestling promotion founded by professional wrestler Tommy Dreamer
 House of Highlights (HoH), a U.S. social media network